

Events 
Cornet virtuoso Luigi Zenobi relocates to Ferrara, becoming the most highly paid musician at the Este court.

Publications 
Lodovico Agostini –  for five voices, book 3, Op. 10 (Ferrara: Vittorio Baldini)
Elias Ammerbach –  (Nuremberg: Gerlach), a collection of organ intabulations of various composers
Giammateo Asola
 (Brescia: Tomaso Bozzola)
 for three voices (Venice: Angelo Gardano)
 (Venice: Giacomo Vincenti & Ricciardo Amadino)
 (Venice: Angelo Gardano)
Girolamo Belli – First book of madrigals for six voices (Ferrara: Vittorio Baldini)
Joachim a Burck –  (In Holy Matrimony) for four voices or instruments (Leipzig: Jacob Apel), forty settings of hymns by Ludwig Helmbold
Maddalena Casulana – First book of madrigals for five voices (Venice: Angelo Gardano)
Camillo Cortellini – First book of madrigals for five voices (Ferrara: Vittorio Baldini)
Paschal de l'Estocart –  (150 Psalms of David) for four, five, six, seven, and eight voices (Lyon: Barthelemi Vincent)
Costanzo Festa –  (Munich: Adam Berg), published posthumously
Andrea Gabrieli –  (Penitential Psalms) for six voices (Venice: Angelo Gardano)
William Hunnis – Seven sobs of a sorrowfull soule for sinne (London: Henry Denham), a setting of the penitential psalms and other sacred songs
Nicolas de La Grotte – First book of airs and chansons for three, four, five, and six voices (Paris: Léon Cavellat)
Orlande de Lassus –  (New German Songs, sacred and secular) for four voices (Munich: Adam Berg)
Cristofano Malvezzi – First book of madrigals for five voices (Venice: heirs of Girolamo Scotto)
Rinaldo del Mel – Madrigals for four, five, and six voices (Venice: Angelo Gardano)
Claudio Merulo – First book of motets for six voices (Venice: Angelo Gardano)
Claudio Monteverdi –  (Cremona: Pietro Bozzola & Brescia: Vincenzo Sabbio), a book of madrigals with sacred texts
Jakob Paix – , a book of organ arrangements of dances and motets by various composers
Giovanni Pierluigi da Palestrina – Fourth book of masses for five voices (Rome: Alessandro Gardano), setting texts from the Song of Songs
Giovanni Battista Pinello di Ghirardi –  (German Magnificats in the eight musical tones) for four and five voices (Dresden: Matthäus Stöckel)

Classical music

Births 
September 13 – Girolamo Frescobaldi, Ferrarese keyboardist and composer (died 1643)
December 25 – Orlando Gibbons, English composer (died 1625)
probable
Paolo Agostino, organist and composer (died 1629)
Johann Daniel Mylius, chemist and composer for the lute (died 1642)
Nicolas Vallet, lutenist and composer (died c.1642)

Deaths 
date unknown – Sebastian Westcott, organist of St Paul's Cathedral (born c.1524)

 
Music
16th century in music
Music by year